Rousy Chanev (born 18 September 1945) is a Bulgarian actor. He has appeared in 30 films since 1966. He starred in the 1977 film Advantage, which was entered into the 28th Berlin International Film Festival where it won the Silver Bear for Best Director.

Selected filmography
 Torrid Noon (1965)
 Advantage (1977)
 Warming Up Yesterday's Lunch (2002)
 The Colour of the Chameleon (2012)

References

External links

1945 births
Living people
Bulgarian male stage actors
Bulgarian male film actors
Actors from Burgas
20th-century Bulgarian male actors
21st-century Bulgarian male actors